James Taylor (27 October 1893 – 15 December 1969) was an Australian rules footballer who played with Essendon in the Victorian Football League (VFL).

Family
The son of James Taylor, J.P. (1949-1902), the secretary of McCracken's City Brewery, and Mary Taylor (1849-1927), née Russell, James Taylor was born at Essendon, Victoria on 27 October 1893.

Football
He played in one senior match for Essendon, against St Kilda, at the East Melbourne Cricket Ground, on 18 May 1918, at a time when Essendon was having great difficulty fielding teams  having not contested either the 1916 or 1917 VFL season.

Military service
At the age of 48, Taylor, a grocer, enlisted in the Volunteer Defence Corps, and served in the 9th Battalion of VDC during World War II.

Death
He died at Hamilton, Victoria on 15 December 1969.

Notes

References
 Holmesby, Russell & Main, Jim (2014), The Encyclopedia of AFL Footballers: every AFL/VFL player since 1897 (10th ed.), Seaford, Victoria: BAS Publishing. 
 Maplestone, M., Flying Higher: History of the Essendon Football Club 1872–1996, Essendon Football Club, (Melbourne), 1996. 
 World War Two Nominal Roll: Private James Taylor (V351663), Department of Veterans' Affairs.
 World War Two Service Record: Private James Taylor (V351663), National Archives of Australia.

External links 

1893 births
1969 deaths
Australian rules footballers from Melbourne
Essendon Football Club players
People from Essendon, Victoria